The Cape Hornet was a newspaper that operated from Port Elizabeth in the Cape Colony in 1879.

The Cape Hornet ran only from 5 June until 29 November 1879, just under 6 months in total. It was edited by William T. Eady and illustrated by the cartoonist Charles Barber, who had previously worked for the other major Port Elizabeth publication at the time, the Observer. The illustrations covered public events and political satire. The Hornet was a prominent supporter of the attempt by Carnarvon to enforce a British confederation on southern Africa.

References
 online The Schröder Art Memento (1893) - Leo Weinthal (editor)

Defunct newspapers published in South Africa
Publications established in 1879
Publications disestablished in 1879
1879 establishments in the Cape Colony
1879 disestablishments in the Cape Colony